Jayprakash Narayan International Airport  is an international airport serving Patna, the capital of Bihar, India. It is named after the independence activist and political leader, Jayprakash Narayan. It is the 14th busiest airport in India. To meet demand, the Airports Authority of India (AAI) is working to expand and modernise airport infrastructure. The airport is currently undergoing an ambitious expansion project that includes a new two-level passenger terminal, which will be completed by December 2023.

Overview
The current runway of the airport is only around 6,800 feet long, which makes it not possible for large aircraft to land. The terminal building at the airport is spread across an area of 12,000 square meters and can handle around 2.5 million passengers annually. The waiting areas, as well as departure and arrival areas of the terminal building, have also been expanded recently due to the rising amounts of passengers flying to the airport. Due to the surge in passenger traffic, a new terminal is under construction which will replace the existing terminal.

Future expansion
Due to the sandwiching location between the Sanjay Gandhi Jaivik Udyan and Phulwari Sharif railway station, the runway of the airport is too short to accommodate larger aircraft. Because of this, and the rising demand and passenger traffic, the present terminal will not be able to cope with it. So, a new terminal is under construction since October 2018, at a cost of ₹ 12.17 billion (US$1.52 billion). It will have an area of 65,155 sq.m. (previously proposed as 57,000 sq.m.) from 7,200 sq.m. at present, with six aerobridges and the apron will be able to handle 14 aircraft, which at present can handle only six aircraft. The existing Air Traffic Control (ATC) tower will be demolished once the new tower adjacent to Birla Institute of Technology, Patna campus, becomes operational. The interior design of the terminal will mostly be inspired by Madhubani art, which is a renowned traditional art form of Bihar. The design was created by the Singapore-based firm, Meinhardt and is being executed by the Hyderabad-based firm, Nagarjuna Construction Company Limited (NCC). It will be able to serve more than 8 million passengers per year (previously proposed as 4.5 million), as compared to only around 3 million passengers per year at present. Around 13.1 acres of land near the airport is used for its construction, and in lieu of 11.35 acres of land in Anisabad, the airport will be transferred to the Government of Bihar by the Airports Authority of India (AAI), once the expansion works are completed. The area where the terminal is being built had several buildings, which included the Airport Colony and the IAS Bhavan, which are demolished, and utility buildings like the meteorological centre and Bihar Flying Club have been shifted. Once completed, the existing terminal will be demolished to make way for the expansion and revamping of the apron. The new terminal was expected be completed by 2021, but due to the COVID-19 pandemic, which caused lack of labour and resulted in many delays, it is now confirmed to be completed by December 2023. 

In October 2016, The Cabinet of Bihar approved the Patna Master Plan, which envisages development of a new passenger terminal at Bihta. The Government of Bihar is acquiring 126 acres of land for construction of the terminal.

Airlines and destinations

Statistics 

As of 2019-2020 data, Patna airport handled more than 4 million passengers which was the highest ever recorded at the airport before the COVID-19 pandemic. Aircraft movements are currently at 25,501 which also has increased by 18.2% since previous years. Between 2021-22 the Patna Airport also handled 	12,409 metric tonnes of cargo which also increased by 4.6% from the previous years. Patna Airport is currently the 14th busiest airport in India in terms of passengers catered by the airport.

Passenger, Aircraft Movement, and Cargo at Patna Airport (2011-2022)

Accidents and incidents
 On 17 July 2000, Alliance Air Flight 7412 crashed near the airport, killing 60 people.
 On 19 June 2022, SpiceJet Boeing 737 flight SG723 with 185 passengers on-board made an emergency landing at Patna Airport after one of the engines caught fire in a suspected bird hit.

See also
 Bihta Air Force Station
 Darbhanga Airport
 Gaya Airport
 List of airports in India
 List of the busiest airports in India

References

External links
 Patna Airport webpage at official Airports Authority of India web site.

Airports in Bihar
International airports in India
Buildings and structures in Patna
Transport in Patna
Memorials to Jayaprakash Narayan
Airports with year of establishment missing